The Grand Choral Synagogue of Saint Petersburg is the third-largest synagogue in Europe. Other names include The Great Choral Synagogue of Saint Petersburg and (since 2000) The Edmond J Safra Grand Choral Synagogue. Sometimes it is simply referred to as the Saint Petersburg Synagogue or Bolshaya Sinagoga. It was built between 1880 and 1888, and consecrated in December 1893. The synagogue is located at 2 Lermontovskii Prospekt, Saint Petersburg, Russia. The Chief Rabbi of Saint Petersburg is Menachem Mendel Pewzner. Today the synagogue is a registered landmark and an architectural monument of federal importance.

History

Permit from the emperor
By 1870, there were about ten Jewish houses of worship in Saint Petersburg; however, there was no synagogue in which the Jewish community as a whole could meet in what was then the capital of the Russian Empire.

The construction of the Grand Synagogue was made possible after Tsar Alexander II granted permission on 1 September 1869 in response to a request from the wealthy Russian Jewish philanthropist Joseph Günzburg (Evzel' Gavriilovich Gintsburg) and the first chairman of the St. Petersburg Jewish Community, entrepreneur and railroad developer Samuel Polyakov. Joseph's son Horace was chairman of the Saint Petersburg Jewish Community in 1869–1909 and supervised the construction of the synagogue.

The plot of land for the synagogue was bought in 1879 for 65,000 rubles. The construction of the synagogue was subject to multiple conditions and restrictions. For example, the synagogue could not be sited near Christian churches, nor near government roads used by the tsars. Another restriction was the height of the building, which was limited to 47 meters, instead of the 65 meters proposed by the architects. In fact, no building in Saint Petersburg could be higher than 23 meters, the height of the tsar's Winter Palace, and exemptions were only given for bell towers and domes, because they also served as observation towers for fire watch and other safety purposes. While allowing the synagogue to be 47 meters tall, the tsar imposed several other requirements in his edict, which reads in part: "His Majesty, noting that a more modest appearance befits the building of the first synagogue in the capital, according to the civic standing of Jews in our homeland, gives the Tsar's permission for building the synagogue."

Architecture

The architects and supervisors for the first synagogue in Saint Petersburg chose the Moorish style for its design, modeled in part after Berlin's Oranienburger Straße New Synagogue with its melange of Moorish and Byzantine motifs. In the end, the project boasted an eclectic blend of neo-Byzantine and Moorish revival styles with Arabesque motifs, upon the request of V. V. Stasov, the influential Russian art critic and supervisor of the project. The Great Choral Synagogue was designed by architects I.I. Shaposhnikov, L. Bakhman, and V.A. Shreter, with the participation of V. V. Stasov and N. L. Benois, who was the curator of the project and the confidant of the tsar and the Russian government. Poet Osip Mandelstam later called the building a "lush strangler fig tree."

The land for the synagogue was allocated near the Mariinsky Theatre. The construction was carried out under the management of the Construction Committee headed by A.A. Kaufman. The architect and superintendent of construction was A.V. Malov, between 1880 and 1888, and his assistants were S.O. Klein and B.I. Girshovich. The Small Synagogue was opened first, in 1886. The Great Choral Synagogue was consecrated in 1893.

During the First World War
A 100-bed hospital for the wounded of all religions was organised by the Jewish community of Saint Petersburg on the premises of the synagogue. The yeshiva building near the synagogue also served as a medical facility for many years.

In the Soviet era
After the 1917 revolution and the subsequent Russian Civil War, the Jewish community of Saint Petersburg lost many members to emigration. The Soviet authorities imposed a restriction on bank accounts related to the synagogue and dissolved the Saint Petersburg Jewish Community, in a decree signed by Grigory Zinoviev.

During the Second World War
The Saint Petersburg Synagogue was bombed by the Nazis during the Siege of Leningrad between 1941 and 1943. However, the hospital on the premises of the synagogue remained in operation. The Jewish community managed to survive the siege of Leningrad, as well as other oppression over the years.

Today

National landmark
Today the Great Choral Synagogue of Saint Petersburg is a registered landmark and an architectural monument of federal importance. Major reconstruction was carried out between 2000 and 2003. On 5 Tamuz 5761 (26 June 2001), the Great Hall was reopened after reconstruction. The Great Hall, also called the Main Hall, holds 1200 and has women's galleries on three sides.

Reconstruction and renaming
After a $5 million donation by the Safra family in 1999, the synagogue was reconstructed between 2000 and 2005. As a condition of the donation, the synagogue was renamed The Edmond J Safra Grand Choral Synagogue, although the community still calls it in Russian Bolshaya Sinagoga ("The Grand Synagogue").

In 2005 a new mikvah was built from a design by Israeli architect M. Gorelik. The new mikvah was inaugurated on 19 April 2005.

Anti-Semitic attacks
On 5 May 2012, a swastika was spray-painted on the fence of the Grand Choral Synagogue.

Gallery

See also 
 Moscow Choral Synagogue
 Kharkiv Choral Synagogue

References

External links
 Petersburg's Oldest Historic Synagogue Reopens"
 The Jewish Virtual History Tour: Russia
 Grand Choral Synagogue (Saint Petersburg)

Jews and Judaism in Saint Petersburg
Orthodox synagogues in Russia
Synagogues completed in 1888
Religious buildings and structures in Saint Petersburg
21st-century attacks on synagogues and Jewish communal organizations
Moorish Revival architecture in Russia
Moorish Revival synagogues
Cultural heritage monuments of federal significance in Saint Petersburg